Ronnie Sessions (born December 7, 1948 in Henryetta, Oklahoma, United States) is an American country music singer. Between 1972 and 1986, he recorded for MGM, MCA and Compleat. He also charted sixteen times on the Hot Country Songs charts, including the Top 20 hits "Wiggle Wiggle" and "Me and Millie". Sessions got his start at age nine, when he performed on the Trading Post Show.

Discography

Albums

Singles

References

American country singer-songwriters
MCA Records artists
MGM Records artists
Living people
Singer-songwriters from Oklahoma
1948 births
Country musicians from Oklahoma